Major George Pitt Rose   (7 January 1797 – 19 September 1851) was a British politician and soldier who served as MP for Christchurch. From a Tory background, he was well-connected in the political world.

Early life
Rose was born to George Henry Rose and Frances Duncombe, daughter of Thomas Duncombe of Duncombe Park, Yorkshire, one of the wealthiest young women in the country. He went up to St John's College, Cambridge in 1815.

Career
Rose joined the 15th Hussars as a Cornet in 1822, was promoted to Lieutenant in 1824, to Captain in 1826 and Major in 1841. Later in 1847 he was also appointed Captain in the 5th Foot. Meanwhile in 1826 his father who was already Member of Parliament for Christchurch brought Rose along to serve as his second MP for the Christchurch constituency, Rose was elected as Tory MP for Christchurch in the 1826 General Election and served through the 1830 United Kingdom general election and the 1831 United Kingdom general election.

Personal life
Rose was married on 30 April 1828 to Phoebe Susannah Vesey, daughter of Maj.-Gen. John Agmondesham Vesey, they had one son together, George Ernest Rose. George Ernest Rose followed him into the army, saw active service in the Crimea and acted as an aide-de-camp to his uncle General Hugh Rose during the Indian mutiny. He died at Calcutta, 'aged 27', in 1865. 

Rose died intestate in Winchester on 19 September 1851, his wife and son were allowed provision from a trust fund of some £22,000 in his father's will drawn up later that year and proved on 9 July 1855, in addition to an annuity settled on his wife in 1833.

References

Notes
 

1797 births
1851 deaths
Alumni of St John's College, Cambridge
Members of the Parliament of the United Kingdom for English constituencies
UK MPs 1826–1830
UK MPs 1830–1831
UK MPs 1831–1832
Clerks of the Parliaments
Clan Rose
People educated at Eton College